XL7 or XL-7 may refer to:

Vehicles 
 Hino XL7, a 2019–present Japanese-American conventional cab truck
 Suzuki XL-7, a 1998–2009 Japanese mid-size SUV
 Suzuki XL7, a 2020–present Japanese multi-purpose vehicle

Other uses 
 2014 XL7, an asteroid